Contemporary Debates in Aesthetics and the Philosophy of Art is a 2005 book edited by Matthew Kieran in which pairs of authors dispute central topics in philosophy of art.

Reception
Jenefer Robinson calls it "a very good book".

References 

2005 non-fiction books
Edited volumes
English-language books
Aesthetics books